"Hush" is the second single from American rapper LL Cool J's tenth studio album, The DEFinition (2004). Produced by 7 Aurelius, who provides additional vocals, the song was released on September 7, 2004, by Def Jam Recordings. "Hush" charted at number 26 on the US Billboard Hot 100, number 11 on the Billboard Hot Rap Singles chart, and number 14 on the Billboard Hot R&B/Hip-Hop Singles & Tracks chart. The single became a top-10 success in the United Kingdom, where it debuted and peaked at number three on the UK Singles Chart in February 2005.

Track listings

US 12-inch single
A1. "Hush" (radio)
A2. "Hush" (instrumental)
A3. "Hush" (a cappella)
B1. "Rub My Back" (radio)
B2. "Rub My Back" (instrumental)
B3. "Rub My Back" (a cappella)

UK CD1 and European CD single
 "Hush" (radio edit) – 3:35
 "The Truth" – 3:42

UK CD2
 "Hush" (radio edit) – 3:35
 "Luv U Better" – 4:49
 "Hey Lover" – 4:48
 "Hush" (video)

UK 12-inch single
A1. "Hush" (radio edit) – 3:35
A2. "The Truth" – 3:42
B1. "Luv U Better" – 4:48

Charts

Weekly charts

Year-end charts

Release history

References

2004 singles
2004 songs
Def Jam Recordings singles
LL Cool J songs
Songs written by Channel 7 (musician)
Songs written by LL Cool J